General Teofil Gh. Sidorovici (13 February 1896 – 22 November 1940) was one of the commanders of the Straja Țării (Watchmen), a paramilitary youth organization in the Kingdom of Romania, created in 1935, and Minister of National Propaganda in the sixth Gheorghe Tătărescu cabinet, after the resignation of Constantin C. Giurescu. 

He was born in Bucșoaia village, part of the Duchy of Bukovina within Austria-Hungary at the time, now in Romania's Suceava County.

Sidorovici committed suicide in Bucharest on 22 November 1940.

His sister was the Stalinist Alexandra Sidorovici, who became a public prosecutor of the People's Tribunals, an office which allowed her to ask for death sentences for many collaborators of the Ion Antonescu regime; she was a member of the nomenklatura of the Communist government.

Works

References

Bibliography 

 

1896 births
1940 deaths
People from Frasin
Members of the Romanian Cabinet
Suicides in Romania